Leptochroptila is a genus of moths belonging to the subfamily Tortricinae of the family Tortricidae. It contains only one species, Leptochroptila daratua, which is found in New Guinea.

See also
List of Tortricidae genera

References

Archipini
Tortricidae genera